The 1919 Tempe Normal Owls football team was an American football team that represented Tempe Normal School (later renamed Arizona State University) as an independent during the 1919 college football season. In their first and only season under head coach George E. Cooper, the Owls compiled a 0–2 record and were outscored by their opponents by a combined total of 104 to 3. In the first game of the season, the team lost, 59–0, in the Arizona–Arizona State football rivalry.

Schedule

References

Tempe Normal
Arizona State Sun Devils football seasons
College football winless seasons
Tempe Normal Owls football